Virrei Amat is a station on line 5 of the Barcelona Metro. The station is located underneath Plaça Virrei Amat, between Carrer Felip II and Carrer Varsòvia. It was opened in 1959. The curved side-platform station has a ticket hall on either end, each with two accesses.

Services

External links

 Virrei Amat at Trenscat.com

Railway stations in Spain opened in 1959
Barcelona Metro line 5 stations
Transport in Nou Barris